Crying is the 3rd album by Roy Orbison, released in 1962. It was his 2nd album on the Monument Record label. The album name comes from the 1961 hit song of the same name that would be the first of Orbison's five Chart-topping singles in Australia. In 2002 the song was honored with a Grammy Hall of Fame Award, and In 2004, it ranked #69 on Rolling Stone Magazine's "500 Greatest Songs of All Time". The album itself was ranked #136 on Pitchfork's 200 Best Albums of the 1960s.

Track listing

Personnel
Roy Orbison - vocals, guitar
Boudleaux Bryant, Fred Carter Jr., Grady Martin, Hank Garland, Harold Bradley, Joe Tanner, Ray Edenton, Scotty Moore - guitar
Bob Moore - bass
Bill Pursell, Floyd Cramer - piano
Buddy Harman, John Greubel - drums
Charlie McCoy - harmonica
Boots Randolph, Harry Johnson - saxophone
Cam Mullins, Karl Garvin - trumpet
Byron Bach - cello
Brenton Banks, Cecil Brower, Dorothy Walker, George Binkley, Lillian Hunt, Solie Fott, Suzanne Parker, Vernal Richardson, Wilda Tinsley - violin
Howard Carpenter - viola
Technical
Bill Porter - recording engineer

References

External links
 

Roy Orbison albums
1962 albums
Albums produced by Fred Foster
Monument Records albums